Peter Mark Roget (1779–1869) was a British physician and lexicographer known for his thesaurus.

Roget may also refer to:

 Roget's Thesaurus, a widely used English-language thesaurus by Peter Mark Roget

People

 Dominique Mansuy Roget (1760–1832), French knight and baron
 Juan Roget (c. 1550–1624), Catalan spectacle maker and possible inventor of the telescope
 Leo Roget (born 1977), English footballer
 Léon Roget (1858–1909), Belgian soldier and colonial administrator

See also
 Rogeting, modifying a source by using synonyms to fool plagiarism detection software
 "The Mystery of Marie Rogêt", 1842 short story by Edgar Allan Poe